Giorgos Sigalas (alternate spelling: Georgios) (born July 31, 1971 in Peristeri, Athens, Greece), is a retired Greek professional basketball player and basketball coach. During the decade of the 1990s, the 2.01 m (6'7") tall swingman was the regular team captain of the pro club Olympiacos Piraeus, of the Greek League and the EuroLeague, and also of the Greece men's national basketball team. Nicknamed Rambo, during his playing career, Sigalas was one of the best European defensive players of his generation.

Sigalas helped Olympiacos Piraeus to win a EuroLeague title in 1997, as well as to make two more EuroLeague Finals appearances, in 1994 and 1995. With the Greece men's national team, he competed in six consecutive EuroBasket tournaments, (1993, 1995, 1997, 1999, 2001, and 2003), and he made it to the semifinals on the first three occasions. Sigalas was also instrumental on the Greek teams that made the semifinals of both the 1994 FIBA World Championship and the 1998 FIBA World Championship, as well as on Greece's team that finished in fifth place at the 1996 Summer Olympic Games.

Professional career

Greece
Sigalas won five consecutive Greek League championships, while playing with Olympiacos Piraeus, from 1993 to 1997. He also won two Greek Cup titles with Olympiacos, in 1994 and 1997. He also served as the team's captain.

In 1997, while playing with Olympiacos, Sigalas won the European basketball Triple Crown, meaning his team won the Greek League championship, the Greek Cup title, and also the European-wide top-tier level EuroLeague championship, all in the same season. As of 2020, it is still the only time it has happened in the club's history.

Italy
Sigalas left Olympiacos Piraeus in 1997, after winning the EuroLeague championship with them, and he then joined the Italian League team Olimpia Milano. He played there during the 1997–98 season.

Return to Greece
Sigalas then returned to the Greek League the following year, to play with Aris Thessaloniki. He stayed with Aris until 2000, when he transferred to Aris' arch-rival PAOK Thessaloniki, with whom he played with from 2000 to 2002.

Spain
Sigalas next played in the Spanish League with Granada, at the beginning of the 2002–03 season.

Back to Italy
Sigalas returned to the Italian League, to play with Viola Reggio Calabria, at the end of the 2002–03 season.

End of career in Greece
In the last years of his pro playing career, Sigalas returned home to once again play in the Greek League, to finish his club career. He played with Makedonikos in the 2003–04 season, with Panionios in the 2004–05 season, and finally, Sigalas ended his career back with Aris, where he played from 2005, until he retired in the year 2007.

National team career

Greece under-18, under-20 national teams
Sigalas made his U18 international debut with the Greece men's national under-18 basketball team at the 1990 FIBA Europe Under-18 Championship, and the Greece men's national under-20 basketball team won a silver medal at the 1992 FIBA Europe Under-20 Championship.

Greece men's national team
Sigalas was the long-time captain of the Greece men's national basketball team. He played with the Greece men's national team in 185 games. With Greece's senior team, he competed in six consecutive EuroBaskets (1993, 1995, 1997, 1999, 2001, and 2003).

Sigalas competed with the Greece men's national team at the 1994 FIBA World Championship, and the 1998 FIBA World Championship, as well as at the 1996 Atlanta Summer Olympic Games.

Post-playing career
After retiring from playing professional club basketball, Sigalas worked as a TV basketball commentator in Greece, for EuroLeague games. He also worked as a basketball coach for the Greece men's national under-20 basketball team. He would coach Ermis Lagkada, during the 2009–10 season.

Later, he coached the Cypriot League team Keravnos, and the Greek team Aigaleo. 

In January 2020, Sigalas was hired as the assistant coach of Ilias Kantzouris, for Greek Basket League club Iraklis Thessaloniki. He then spent two seasons as an assistant coach with Kolossos Rodou, before returning to Aris in 2022, under coach Kastritis.

Awards and accomplishments

Pro club career
5× consecutive Greek League Champion: (1993–1997)
5× consecutive Greek League Finals MVP: (1993–1997)
2× Greek Cup Winner: (1994, 1997)
7× Greek League All-Star: (1994 I, 1994 II, 1996 I, 1996 II, 1998, 2001, 2002)
EuroLeague All-Final Four Team: (1994)
FIBA European Selection: (1995)
FIBA EuroStar: (1996)
Greek League MVP: (1996)
EuroLeague Champion: (1997)
Triple Crown Winner: (1997)
Acropolis Tournament MVP: (1999)

References

External links
FIBA Europe Profile
FIBA Profile
Euroleague.net Profile
Eurobasket.com Profile
Spanish League Profile 
Italian League Profile 
Draftexpress.com Profile
Hellenic Basketball Federation Profile 

1971 births
Living people
1998 FIBA World Championship players
Aris B.C. players
Aris B.C. coaches
Basketball players at the 1996 Summer Olympics
CB Granada players
Greek basketball coaches
Greek Basket League players
Greek men's basketball players
Iraklis Thessaloniki B.C. coaches
Kolossos Rodou B.C. coaches
Liga ACB players
Makedonikos B.C. players
Olimpia Milano players
Olympiacos B.C. players
Olympic basketball players of Greece
Panionios B.C. players
P.A.O.K. BC players
Papagou B.C. players
Shooting guards
Small forwards
Viola Reggio Calabria players
1994 FIBA World Championship players
Basketball players from Athens